A pea is a small spherical seed or the seed-pod of various plants commonly used as a source of food, particularly Pisum sativum.

Pea or PEA may also refer to:

Geography
 Pea River, Alabama, US
 Peas Creek, a stream in Iowa

Medicine
 Pulseless electrical activity, a form of cardiac arrest

Chemistry
 Phenethylamine, also known as β-phenylethylamine

 Palmitoylethanolamide
 Poly(ethylene adipate)
 Polyetheramine; see Techron

Organisations
 Phillips Exeter Academy, a private boarding school located in New Hampshire, US
 Professional Esports Association, an esports advocacy organization and former esports league
 Progressive Education Association, a US organization dedicated to spreading progressive education in public schools from 1919–1955
 Promoting Equality in African Schools, a UK-based charity
 Produzioni Europee Associati, a former Italian film production and distribution company, owned by Alberto Grimaldi
 Provincial Electricity Authority, a Thai state enterprise responsible for providing power to the provincial areas of Thailand
 Pontifical Ecclesiastical Academy

Other
 "Pea" (song), on the Red Hot Chili Peppers album One Hot Minute
 Peartree railway station (National Rail station code), England
 Public Eye Awards, an award given to the corporations deemed most harmful to society
 Pea galaxy or "Green Pea", type of galaxy that appears green
 PEA (file format), the native archive file format of PeaZip
 Proto-Eskimo–Aleut language, reconstructed ancestor of the Eskimo–Aleut languages
 Alfredo Pea (born 1954), Italian actor

See also

 "The Princess and the Pea" (1835), fairytale by Hans Christian Andersen
 List of crops known as peas
 
 
 Pease (disambiguation)
 Peace (disambiguation)
 Piece (disambiguation)